TOTO (all caps) may refer to:

 Toto (band)
 Typhonian Order, formerly known as Typhonian Ordo Templi Orientis (TOTO), an occult magical order
 TOtable Tornado Observatory, a tornado observation device
 Tongue of the Ocean, a deep oceanic trench in the Bahamas
 Toto Ltd., a Japanese toilet manufacturer

See also
 Toto (disambiguation)
 Tōto (disambiguation)